Erin Babcock (6 June 1981 – 25 April 2020) was a Canadian nurse and politician who was elected in the 2015 Alberta general election to the Legislative Assembly of Alberta, representing the electoral district of Stony Plain.

Early life 
Babcock was the daughter of a pipeliner in the Alberta oil industry, and her family lived in many areas across Western Canada during her childhood. She mentioned that her family's involvement in the oil industry had affected their family life and their economic status.

Career 
Babcock worked as a licensed practical nurse since 2006 before entering politics in 2015. She had worked in Kindersley, Saskatchewan as a nurse before moving to Edmonton. Babcock worked closely with elderly and stroke patients as well as patients with serious mental and physical health issues. While in Kindersley, Babcock was involved in the Special Olympics where she served on the board of directors.

Legislative Assembly of Alberta 
In the 2015 Alberta general election, Babcock defeated incumbent Progressive Conservative MLA Ken Lemke to represent Stony Plain. In the 2019 Alberta general election, Stony Plain was dissolved and became Spruce Grove-Stony Plain, and she was defeated by the nominee of the new United Conservative Party, Searle Turton.

Illness and death 
Babcock was diagnosed with uterine cancer in May 2018. She said that she would continue as the MLA for Stony Plain while undergoing cancer treatment. The treatment would take a couple of weeks and did not stop her from pursuing the issues that got her involved in politics. As part of her campaign, Babcock had promised to fight for fair access to health care across Alberta and this continued to be an issue during her treatment. Babcock died from the cancer in Edmonton on 25 April 2020, at age 38.

Electoral history

2019 general election

2015 general election

See also 
 Nursing in Canada
 Women in Canadian politics
 Women in nursing

References 

1981 births
2020 deaths
Alberta New Democratic Party MLAs
Women MLAs in Alberta
21st-century Canadian politicians
Place of birth missing
21st-century Canadian women politicians
Canadian nurses
Deaths from uterine cancer
Canadian women nurses
Deaths from cancer in Alberta